Lester Prairie is a city in McLeod County, Minnesota, United States, along the South Fork of the Crow River.  The population was 1,730 at the 2010 census.  Noted composer and conductor of The Concordia Choir, Rene Clausen was raised in Lester Prairie.

History

Lester Prairie was platted in 1886, and named for John N. Lester, an original owner of the town site. A post office has been in operation at Lester Prairie since 1888. Lester Prairie was incorporated in 1888.

Geography
McLeod County Roads 1, 9, and 23 are the main routes in the community. Minnesota State Highway 7 is in close proximity to the city. A bike trail running east–west through the middle of town, the Dakota Rail Regional Trail, connects Lester Prairie to the Twin cities.

Demographics

2010 census
As of the census of 2010, there were 1,730 people, 654 households, and 463 families living in the city. The racial makeup of the city was 93.9% White, 0.2% African American, 0.2% Native American, 1.1% Asian, 3.8% from other races, and 0.9% from two or more races. Hispanic or Latino of any race were 9.3% of the population.

There were 654 households, of which 37.3% had children under the age of 18 living with them, 58.0% were married couples living together, 8.0% had a female householder with no husband present, 4.9% had a male householder with no wife present, and 29.2% were non-families. 21.3% of all households were made up of individuals, and 9% had someone living alone who was 65 years of age or older. The average household size was 2.65 and the average family size was 3.11.

The median age in the city was 33.8 years. 28% of residents were under the age of 18; 7.6% were between the ages of 18 and 24; 29.3% were from 25 to 44; 23.5% were from 45 to 64; and 11.7% were 65 years of age or older. The gender makeup of the city was 49.5% male and 50.5% female.

2000 census
As of the census of 2000, there were 1,377 people, 516 households, and 379 families living in the city. The racial makeup of the city was 97.68% White, 0.07% Native American, 0.07% Asian, 1.89% from other races, and 0.29% from two or more races. Hispanic or Latino of any race were 4.94% of the population.

There were 516 households, out of which 38.0% had children under the age of 18 living with them, 62.2% were married couples living together, 7.8% had a female householder with no husband present, and 26.4% were non-families. 22.7% of all households were made up of individuals, and 9.5% had someone living alone who was 65 years of age or older.  The average household size was 2.67 and the average family size was 3.14.

In the city, the population was spread out, with 29.9% under the age of 18, 6.9% from 18 to 24, 30.2% from 25 to 44, 19.5% from 45 to 64, and 13.5% who were 65 years of age or older.  The median age was 34 years. For every 100 females, there were 95.6 males.  For every 100 females age 18 and over, there were 96.9 males.

The median income for a household in the city was $44,271, and the median income for a family was $52,417. Males had a median income of $35,463 versus $25,313 for females. The per capita income for the city was $18,223.  About 2.9% of families and 5.1% of the population were below the poverty line, including 6.4% of those under age 18 and 5.0% of those age 65 or over.

Politics

Lester Prairie Schools 
Lester Prairie is home to ISD #424 Lester Prairie Schools. The school is a K-12 school with both elementary and high school located in one building. There are approximately 400 students enrolled. Dr. Melissa Radeke is the district's superintendent. Mike Lee is the K-12 principal.

References

External links
City Website

Cities in Minnesota
Cities in McLeod County, Minnesota